Dragan Mustapić (born 23 March 1963) is a male discus thrower from Croatia. His personal best throw was 64.40 metres, achieved in July 2000 in Ljubljana. He also had 18.35 metres in the shot put, achieved in July 2005 in Zagreb.

Mustapić was born in Imotski. He was a five-time Yugoslav discus throw champion (1987–1991) and was the first Yugoslav discus thrower to surpass 60 meters. He finished seventh at the 2001 Mediterranean Games. He also competed at the 1995 World Championships, the 1998 European Championships, as well as the Olympic Games in 1992, 1996, 2000 and 2004 without reaching the final.

Mustapić has a B.Sc. degree in criminology and a Ph.D. in economics. During his sports career, he was an officer in the Croatian Army. As of 2019, he attained a rank of colonel, and was teaching at the Franjo Tuđman Military Academy in Zagreb.

Achievements

References

Yugoslav male discus throwers
Bosnia and Herzegovina male discus throwers
Croatian male discus throwers
Athletes (track and field) at the 1992 Summer Olympics
Athletes (track and field) at the 1996 Summer Olympics
Athletes (track and field) at the 2000 Summer Olympics
Athletes (track and field) at the 2004 Summer Olympics
Olympic athletes of Croatia
Olympic athletes of Bosnia and Herzegovina
Athletes (track and field) at the 1987 Mediterranean Games
Athletes (track and field) at the 1997 Mediterranean Games
Athletes (track and field) at the 2001 Mediterranean Games
Sportspeople from Imotski
1963 births
Living people
Mediterranean Games competitors for Yugoslavia
Mediterranean Games competitors for Croatia